Nash is a city in Bowie County, Texas, United States, and a suburb of Texarkana. It is part of the Texarkana metropolitan area. The population was 2,960 at the 2010 census, up from 2,169 at the 2000 census. In 2020, its population was 3,814, representing continued population growth as a suburban community.

History

Early years
Long before the birth of Nash, the land on which it is located was in the name of the State of Texas. The State of Texas patented the land which makes up the eastern portion of Nash to William Crutcher on December 19, 1849. The west portion of Nash was patented to Josiah W. Fort, assignee of Thomas Price on December 18, 1951.

Growth period
Originally, the town of Nash was first called "T. C. Junction" or sometimes Texarkana Junction for its location on the transcontinental division of the Texas and Pacific Railway, which officially was entitled from its construction days as the Trans-Continental Division. The first railroad track was built from Marshall eastward to T.C. Junction in 1873. The official origin date of the town is unknown, but records indicate Nash began sometime between 1873 and the late 1880s.

In 1884, the town was renamed "Park", after Dr. John N. Parker, who received a grant for a post office. He was the first postmaster. Dr. Parker changed the name of the town to "Park" because the government would not accept such a long name as Trans-Continental Junction; therefore, he used his own name dropping the "er". In 1906, the town was renamed again to "Nash", in honor of Martin Manny Nash, the Division Superintendent for the Texas & Pacific Railroad Company.

The first school started in 1885, in a single room by Dr. K. M. Kelley, located on the corner of Dodd and Elm streets. In 1890, the town had a store, a pharmacy, two mills, a cotton gin, and 100 inhabitants. In 1894, the town was struck by a cyclone that destroyed one-third of the town, demolishing the first school, the Methodist church, the Baptist Church, several dwellings, and killing two people.

The town of Nash has two cemeteries. The oldest one, referred to as the Handley or Blocker Cemetery, dates back to 1876. This cemetery is the burial place of two Confederate soldiers of the Confederate "army:" T.P. Wagnon, Pvt Co. E. Ragsdale Battn. Cav., and James Bentley, Co. B. 41st Alabama Regiment, who was with Robert E. Lee when he surrendered.  The Nash Cemetery, the second oldest cemetery, is the burial place of the following Confederate soldiers: Joshua R. Brower, A.J. Herrington, Ruben L. Redden, George R. Robinson, George W. Simpson, William G. Blocker, Pvt Co. G. Third Regiment Alabama, and John King.

During the 1950s, the town was incorporated and began to grow again. In 1980, many Nash residents were employed either in Texarkana or at one of two nearby military installations: Red River Army Depot and Lone Star Army Ammunition Plant, located a few miles west of the town. The population was 2,169 in 2000.

Geography

Nash is located in eastern Bowie County at  (33.441774, –94.125315), occupying the area surrounding the intersection of Farm to Market Road 989 (Kings Highway) and U.S. Route 82 (New Boston Road). Nash is bordered to the north and east by the city of Texarkana and to the south by the city of Wake Village. Interstate 30 forms the northern boundary of Nash, with access from Exit 218.

Climate

 The warmest month is either July or August.
 The highest recorded temperature was 108 °F in September 2000.
 On average, the coolest month is January.
 The lowest recorded temperature was –6 °F in 1989.
 The most precipitation on average occurs in November.

Demographics

At the census of 2000, there were 2,169 people, 891 households, and 603 families residing in the city. The racial makeup of the city was 77.87% White, 17.57% African American, 0.92% Native American, 0.32% Asian, 2.67% from other races, and 0.65% from two or more races. Hispanic or Latino of any race were 3.83% of the population. By the publication of the 2020 U.S. census, its population increased to 3,814; racially, non-Hispanic whites and African Americans remained the predominant demographic groups in the city.

In 2000, the median income for a household in the city was $27,614, and the median income for a family was $33,869. Males had a median income of $28,056 versus $22,528 for females. The per capita income for the city was $15,571. About 12.9% of families and 14.8% of the population were below the poverty line, including 17.4% of those under age 18 and 15.0% of those age 65 or over. In 2020, the American Community Survey's estimates program determined the median household income was $37,750. The city had a mean household income of $67,654.

Education
Nash is served by the Texarkana Independent School District.

Notable people
Rick Minter, football coach

References

External links
City of Nash official website

Cities in Bowie County, Texas
Cities in Texas
Cities in Texarkana metropolitan area